Sciences et Avenir (meaning Science and Future in English) is a monthly French popular science magazine, owned by Claude Perdriel. Its distribution in 2019 was 231,000 copies. The editorial team also publish about 15 articles per day on their website.

History
The magazine was founded in 1947. From 1994 to 2003 it was edited by Georges Golbérine. Since September 2003, the managing editor is Carole Chatelain, who has a PhD in nuclear physics and particle physics.

2019-2020, the magazine released a spinoff magazine, "#Sciences", aimed at young people aged 11 and over.

References

External links
 Issues of Sciences et Avenir magazine, from 1947 to 2017
 Annual indexes (summaries and classifications of articles by discipline) from 1947 to 2010

1947 establishments in France
French-language magazines
Magazines published in France
Monthly magazines published in France
Magazines established in 1947
Popular science magazines